The 1903 college football season had no clear-cut champion, with the Official NCAA Division I Football Records Book listing Michigan and Princeton as having been selected national champions.

Conference standings

Major conference standings

Independents

Minor conferences

Minor conference standings

Awards and honors

All-Americans

The consensus All-America team included:

Statistical leaders
Players scoring most points: Thomas S. Hammond, Michigan, 163

References